Caleb Stetson (January 6, 1801 – January 1885) was an American businessman and politician from the Commonwealth of Massachusetts. A Democrat, in 1852 he was elected to serve in the Massachusetts House of Representatives.  In the legislature he was the Chairman of the House Committee on Banking.  He was a member of the Massachusetts Constitutional Convention of 1853. He was also an early promoter and president of the South Shore Railroad. He lost property in the Great fire of Boston.

References

The reference for Caleb Stetson is https://books.google.com/books?id=A3MtAAAAYAAJ&pg=PA20#v=onepage&q=caleb%20stetson&f=false

Bibliography

Annual Obituary Notices of Eminent Persons who Have Died in the United States p. 346 By Nathan Crosby (1858).
 History of Norfolk County, Massachusetts: With Biographical Sketches of Many of Its Pioneers and Prominent Men Vol I. By Duane Hamilton Hurd pp. 131–132. (1884).
 Journal of the Constitutional Convention of the Commonwealth of Massachusetts: Begun and Held in Boston, on the Fourth Day of May, 1853 By Massachusetts Constitutional Convention p. 53, 191(1853).

1801 births
1885 deaths
Democratic Party members of the Massachusetts House of Representatives
Politicians from Braintree, Massachusetts
19th-century American politicians